"Another Way" (also known as Another Way: Secret Version) is a single released by South Korean actor Kim Soo-hyun. It was released on March 14, 2012.

Information
The single was the first independent single of Kim Soo-hyun which was released a day after releasing his OST "One and Only You" from his hit drama The Moon that Embraces the Sun.  The album contains four different version of the title track, "Another Way".

Track listing

Chart performance

Release history

References

2012 singles
2012 songs